Azucena Ángeles Flores (born March 4, 1994), better known by her ring name Zuzu Divine, is a Mexican luchadora, or female professional wrestler, currently performing as freelancer. She has worked for promotions such as Lucha Libre AAA World Wide (AAA) and Desastre Total Ultraviolento (DTU).

Zuzu Divine previously wrestled wearing a mask, but she lost it in a lucha de apuestas match against Diosa Atenea on September 16, 2017.

Professional wrestling career

Zuzu made her professional wrestling debut on January 5, 2013.

Personal life
Zuzu has a daughter.

Championships and accomplishments
Desastre Total Ultraviolento
DTU Nexo Championship (1 time) – with Dariux

Luchas de Apuestas record

Footnotes

References

External links 
 

1994 births
Living people
Sportspeople from Pachuca
Mexican female professional wrestlers
Professional wrestlers from Hidalgo (state)
Masked wrestlers
21st-century professional wrestlers
21st-century Mexican women